Rodger G Gray (born 6 May 1966) is a former association football player who frequently represented New Zealand in the 1990s.

Gray captained the All Whites and ended his international playing career with 39 A-international caps and 4 goals to his credit.

Club history
Mt Wellington (1989)
Waitakere City F.C. (1990- )
Waitemata FC (1987)

References

External links

1966 births
Living people
New Zealand association footballers
New Zealand international footballers
Waitakere City FC players
Association football defenders
1996 OFC Nations Cup players